De Dijk is Dicht  is a 1950 Dutch film directed by Anton Koolhaas.

Cast
Kees Brusse	... 	Bert Verbloeme
Jan Teulings		
Henny Alma	... 	Els
Kitty Knappert	... 	Marietje
Jules Verstraete	... 	Simon
Cor Hermus		
Mieke Flink		
Piet Bron		
Anton Burgdorffer		
Mia Horna		
Coba Kelling		
Fons Peters		
Anneke Rekker		
Henk van Buuren		
Jan van der Linden		
Mieke Verstraete		
Antoinette de Visser

External links 
 

1950 films
Dutch black-and-white films
Dutch drama films
1950 drama films
1950s Dutch-language films